The Curious Expedition a 2016 roguelike exploration video game developed by Maschinen-Mensch for Microsoft Windows, Nintendo Switch, PlayStation 4, and Xbox One. The player takes control of a party who attempts to navigate through several lost locations on earth, each one created through procedural generation. Reviewers have praised the game as charming and challenging, but others have criticized it as repetitive.

Gameplay 
The Curious Expedition is a turn-based exploration game where the player controls several historical characters seeking fame and fortune. To win the game, the player must complete six expeditions through procedurally generated maps, each of which can be explored in a few minutes. The main resource that the player must manage is sanity, and when it runs out, party members become dysfunctional, aggressive, or simply leave. The player can preserve their sanity by using items suited to traversing difficult terrain. During each expedition, the player will experience short text-based story events, including treasure, abandoned sites, and native villages. The player may experience aggressive wild beasts, or loss of reputation from the natives, provoking combat. Combat is fought using dice rolls, which are enhanced based on your party's items and abilities.

Development 
The Curious Expedition was developed by Riad Djemili and Johannes Kistmann. After the German government gave them a €50,000 grant to develop their browser game prototype into a full game release on Steam, they left their jobs at Yager Development, where they worked on Spec Ops: The Line.

Reception 
The Curious Expedition received a 74/100 indicating mixed or average reviews according to Metacritic, while the Nintendo Switch version received a 68/100. Rock Paper Shotgun called it "a fantastic game for generating anecdotes", reviewing positively the detailed worlds and challenge level. PC Gamer said it was "a fun and charming exploration game", with the fun factor depending on whether the game procedurally generates an interesting world. PlayStation Universe called the game "repetitive", but "nonetheless a highly accessible and thoughtfully constructed roguelike, where tactics, discovery, decision-making and luck all meld together beautifully into a charming pint-sized adventure." Screen Rant criticized the game for its repetition, saying "exploring the small selection of region types–jungles, deserts, and the arctic–eventually loses its luster". Nintendo Life called the game "unique" but "punishing", critiquing its simple visuals and progression system. COGconnected also criticized the game for its repetitiveness.

References

External links 

Exploration video games
2016 video games
Windows games
Nintendo Switch games
PlayStation 4 games
Xbox One games
Single-player video games